The 2014 Dalian Aerbin F.C. season is the fifth season in club history, and the third season in the Chinese Super League.

Background
Aerbin signed Ma Lin from Liaoning F.C. as their manager. He was soon replaced by reserve team manager Yasuharu Kurata in May due to the team's poor performance, however the performance was actually connected to insufficient budget as reported.

After the failure to take over Dalian Shide F.C. last season, Aerbin faced serious financial problems, since the debt, facilities and training ground of Dalian Shide were merged into Aerbin, but players in squad were judged as free agent by the CFA, and Aerbin had to follow normal transfer routine to sign them, rather than simply taking over the whole team. It's been reported that the team was unable to pay up salaries and bonuses for more than 10 months under the fact that they had already began to sell valuable players for some budget. Additionally, Aerbin was investigated by FIFA for violating contract with former player Leon Benko. The team ended up 15th by the end of the season, relegated to China League One.

Chinese Super League

League table

League fixtures and results

Chinese FA Cup

Cup fixtures and results

Technical Staff

Player information

Transfers

In

Out

Squad

References

Dalian Professional F.C. seasons
Dalian Aerbin F.C.